Dichrostachys dehiscens is a species of flowering plant in the family Fabaceae. It is found only in Yemen. Its natural habitat is subtropical or tropical dry forests.

References

dehiscens
Endemic flora of Socotra
Vulnerable plants
Taxonomy articles created by Polbot
Taxa named by Isaac Bayley Balfour